Mihkel Räim (born 3 July 1993) is an Estonian cyclist, who currently rides for UCI Continental team . In October 2020, he was named in the startlist for the 2020 Vuelta a España. He is four time Estonian national road race champion. In his career he earned more than 15 UCI victim different categories.

Major results

2010
 1st  Road race, National Junior Road Championships
 1st  Overall Tour de la Region de Łódź
1st Stages 1, 3 & 4
2011
 1st  Road race, Island Games
2012
 9th Jūrmala Grand Prix
2013
 1st Stage 5 Baltic Chain Tour
 8th Jūrmala Grand Prix
2014
 7th Overall Tour of Estonia
2015
 1st  Road race, Island Games
 Grand Prix Chantal Biya
1st  Points classification
1st Stages 1 & 3
 2nd Coppa dei Laghi-Trofeo Almar
 6th Ronde van Vlaanderen Beloften
2016
 1st  Road race, National Road Championships
 1st  Overall Tour de Hongrie
1st Stage 1
 Tour de Beauce
1st Stages 1 & 4
 3rd Overall Tour of Estonia
 3rd Overall Grand Prix Cycliste de Saguenay
 5th GP Kranj
 9th GP Adria Mobil
 9th Tro-Bro Léon
2017
 1st  Road race, Island Games
 1st Stage 1 Tour d'Azerbaïdjan
 1st Stage 4 Colorado Classic
 4th Overall Okolo Slovenska
1st Stage 1
 5th Overall Tour of Estonia
 8th Coppa Bernocchi
 10th Schaal Sels
2018
 1st  Road race, National Road Championships
 1st Great War Remembrance Race
 1st Stage 2 Vuelta a Castilla y León
 1st Stage 4 Tour of Japan
 2nd Rund um Köln
 7th Overall Tour de Korea
1st Stage 2
2019
 1st  Overall Tour of Estonia
1st  Points classification
1st Stage 2
 1st Stage 3 Tour of Romania
 4th Overall Tour of Taihu Lake
 4th Grand Prix de la Somme
 6th Antwerp Port Epic
 7th Grote Prijs Stad Zottegem
2020
 1st Stage 1 Tour of Antalya
2021
 1st  Road race, National Road Championships
 1st  Overall Belgrade–Banja Luka
1st Stage 4
 1st Stage 3 Istrian Spring Trophy
 1st Stage 3 Tour of Bulgaria
 5th Visegrad 4 Bicycle Race – GP Polski
 6th Overall Baltic Chain Tour
 7th GP Slovenian Istria
2022
 1st  Road race, National Road Championships
 8th Overall Tour of Estonia
 8th Overall Baltic Chain Tour

Grand Tour general classification results timeline

References

External links

1993 births
Living people
Estonian male cyclists
Sportspeople from Kuressaare
European Games competitors for Estonia
Cyclists at the 2015 European Games
Cyclists at the 2019 European Games